Saša Janić (born 7 May 1975) is a Croatian German former football player. He spent one season in the Bundesliga with Arminia Bielefeld.

References

External links
 

1975 births
Living people
Croatian footballers
German people of Croatian descent
Stuttgarter Kickers players
SSV Reutlingen 05 players
Arminia Bielefeld players
SpVgg Unterhaching players
FC Augsburg players
SpVgg Ludwigsburg players
Bundesliga players
2. Bundesliga players
3. Liga players
Sportspeople from Ulm
Association football defenders
Footballers from Baden-Württemberg